The giraffe catfish, Auchenoglanis occidentalis, is an African catfish. It eats plants off the floor of lakes and streams.

Distribution and habitat
The giraffe catfish is found throughout Africa in lakes and rivers, partially due to introduction and establishment in other areas. It is found in many important lakes and rivers such as the Nile and Lake Chad. Its distribution covers includes bodies of water from East Africa to West Africa. It generally lives in shallow waters with muddy bottoms.

Anatomy and appearance
This fish has a maximum size that sources say are between two and three feet.

The giraffe-like pattern will fade with age to a two-tone mottled brown. Various subspecies have been described for this fish, indicating some geographical variation in coloration.

Reproduction
Eggs are scattered in a nest and guarded by the male. Dinotopterus cunningtoni takes advantage of the care and allows the male giraffe catfish to care for its eggs and young, an example of interspecific brood care.

Relationship to humans
The giraffe catfish is occasionally imported for the aquarium trade. Because of its large eventual size and its fast rate of growth, it is inappropriate for smaller aquaria. This fish will readily accept a variety of foods and is tolerant of a wide variety of water conditions. They will scavenge the aquarium looking for food, which could cause in the uprooting of plants.

This fish is also an important food fish in Africa.

References

Risch, L.M., 2003. Claroteidae. p. 60-96 In C. Lévêque, D. Paugy and G.G. Teugels (eds.) Faune des poissons d'eaux douce et saumâtres de l'Afrique de l'Ouest, Tome 2. Coll. Faune et Flore tropicales 40. Musée Royal de l'Afrique Centrale, Tervuren, Belgique, Museum National d'Histoire Naturalle, Paris, France and Institut de Recherche pour le Développement, Paris, France. 815 p.

Claroteidae
Catfish of Africa
Fish described in 1840
Taxa named by Achille Valenciennes